The Firewall Forward CAM 100 is a  four-cylinder, four-stroke liquid-cooled piston aircraft engine built by Firewall Forward Aero Engines. Originally designed and built by Canadian Airmotive as the CAM 100 and later marketed by The Cam-Fire Engine Group, it is based on a Honda Civic automotive piston engine.

Applications
ARV Griffin
Blue Yonder Merlin
Denney Kitfox V
Historical PZL P.11c
Historical Ryan STA
Midget Mustang
Murphy Rebel
Zenith Zodiac CH 601

Specifications (CAM 100)

See also

References

Notes

External links
 Firewall Forward Aero Engines

1990s aircraft piston engines
Firewall Forward aircraft engines